The Special Inspector General for Pandemic Recovery (SIGPR) is an Inspector General position created by the Coronavirus Aid, Relief, and Economic Security (CARES) Act of 2020 to oversee spending of government funds in response to the COVID-19 pandemic in the United States. The position was included at the insistence of congressional Democrats. The SIGPR is nominated by the president and confirmed by the Senate.

The position, as specified in Section 4018 of the CARES Act, is authorized to

History 
President Donald Trump signed the CARES Act into law on 27 March 2020, but immediately noted that several stipulations related oversight would be ignored. The White House highlighted the language authorizing "the SIGPR to request information from other government agencies and requires the SIGPR to report to the Congress 'without delay' any refusal of such a request that 'in the judgment of the Special Inspector General' is unreasonable" and stated that the SIGPR would not be allowed to submit reports to Congress without White House supervision. Critics of Trump's stance included Senators Mitt Romney (R-Utah) and Jon Tester (D-Mont), who wrote a letter to Trump on 3 April urging compliance with oversight requirements.

Brian Miller 

On 3 April 2020, President Trump indicated that he would nominate Brian D. Miller to be the Special Inspector General for Pandemic Recovery. At the time, Miller was a special assistant to Trump and senior associate counsel in the Office of White House Counsel. This raised concerns about his ability to be apolitical; a former assistant U.S. attorney opined, "It’s antithetical to oversight to have someone with a tight connection to the White House. It seems weird to have a White House lawyer play this role." The selection was praised by the Project on Government Oversight, among others, but criticized by Democrats, who noted that Miller, as part of the White House Counsel, defended President Trump during his first impeachment. Senate Democratic Leader Chuck Schumer released a statement on April 4 saying that "a member of the president’s own staff is exactly the wrong type of person to choose for this position."

Miller was formally nominated by the Trump administration on 6 April 2020. The U.S. Senate Banking Committee held his confirmation hearing on May 5 and voted on May 12 to advance his nomination to the full Senate. The Senate confirmed him on June 2.

See also 
 COVID-19 Congressional Oversight Commission
 Pandemic Response Accountability Committee
 United States House Select Subcommittee on the Coronavirus Crisis

References

External links 
 

U.S. federal government response to the COVID-19 pandemic
Law associated with the COVID-19 pandemic in the United States
Pandemic
Executive branch of the government of the United States